Electoral district of Stanley may refer to:

Electoral district of Stanley (Queensland), former district of the Legislative Assembly of Queensland, 1873 to 1950
Electoral district of Stanley (South Australia), former district of the South Australian House of Assembly, 1862 to 1956
Electoral district of County of Stanley, former district of the Legislative Council of New South Wales, 1851 to 1856
Electoral district of Stanley County, former district of the Legislative Assembly of New South Wales, 1856 to 1859